The Central District of Khalilabad County is a district (bakhsh) in Khalilabad County, Razavi Khorasan province, Iran. At the 2006 census, its population was 26,770, in 7,276 families.  The district has one city: Khalilabad.  The district has two rural districts (dehestan): Howmeh Rural District and Rostaq Rural District.

References 

Districts of Razavi Khorasan Province
Khalilabad County